Lucas Corrêa de Oliveira, known professionally as Lucas Lucco (born April 4, 1991), is a Brazilian singer, songwriter, and actor. Married to model Lorena Carvalho Lucco, the Brazilian musician also works occasionally as a model, scriptwriter, and directs his own music videos.  He has been a participant of the Brazilian dance competition Dança dos Famosos segment on Domingão do Faustão program,  and reporter for a day of CQC program. At the end of 2015, he attended a CrossFit championship in Barra da Tijuca, Rio de Janeiro, called P9 Games.

Biography and career 

Born in Patrocínio, Minas Gerais, the son of radio broadcaster Paulo Roberto de Oliveira and Karina Luiza Corrêa de Oliveira, brother of Leandro Corrêa de Oliveira who is a DJ, Lucas started singing and learning to play guitar at age ten. He created his first composition at age 11 called "50%". His first performance was also at 11 at a school festival. He began working as a 13-year-old as an office boy before moving on to a salesman in a shopping mall in Belo Horizonte. Later, he also became a professional model for five years where he came to be known by the name Lucas Corrêa. During this time, he made several photographic essays. He also worked as a promoter. He studied a course on advertising in a college in Patos de Minas, but decided to give it up to dedicate himself to his career. He was also part of a trio sertanejo called "Skypiras."

According to the singer, he finds inspiration for his compositions through the routine of people. He says his goal is to write songs with themes that everyone can relate to. He cites several artists of the sertanejo music as his influences, with his top two being Zezé Di Camargo & Luciano and Jorge & Mateus. Due to the similarity in some songs and visuals, Lucco tends to gain many comparisons with Gusttavo Lima.

Early career 

The beginning of Lucas' musical career started with the recording of the song "Amor Bipolar" in 2011, which was made available on YouTube. Eventually, the businessman Rodrigo Byça saw the video and contacted him. A few days after  dropping his modeling career to enter the music scene, he was patronized by the duo Israel & Rodolffo, and they began to perform together. They recorded the song "Previsões".

The singer's song "Pra Te Fazer Lembrar" reached almost ten million hits on YouTube. A few months later, he released two new singles "Plano B" and "Pac Man", which he later performed at the "Caldas Country 2012" festival in Caldas Novas, Goiás. He eventually decided to pursue a new musical style called arrocha: "I used to be more romantic. Then when I saw that 'Plan B,' an arrocha song, worked, I wanted to compose more in this style."

In mid-2012, Lucas released his first album titled "Nem te Conto," which features fifteen tracks. This includes the songs  "Na Horizontal" and "Nem te Conto (Sogrão)". In March 2013, Lucas Lucco released his first official video, titled "Princesinha" which surpassed four million views in less than three months.

Lucco's artistic name is the junction of three letters of his name with two of his last name: LUC = Lucas C = Corrêa O = Oliveira.

Partnership with the duo Fernando and Sorocaba 

Singers and businessmen Fernando & Sorocaba invited Lucas to be part of FS Artistic Productions. In addition to being part of the duo's office, Lucas Lucco released a song with them entitled "Foi Daquele Jeito." This song was a re-recording of the original song by Thaeme & Thiago, who were also members of FS Produções. After the release of these songs, Lucas began to be compared to the singer Ricky Martin, who he considers one of his idols. He was also labeled by various media as "the new popstar of Brazilian music."

Her first success after the release of the album "Nem te Conto" was the song "É Treta", in which he talks about the advantage of not being in a relationship. In March 2013, Lucas Lucco released the song "Nobody Could Predict" in honor of the death of Chorão, lead singer of Charlie Brown Jr. Although both songs were differnet than his usual style, they were still well received by the public. However, he also received some criticism, which he addressed directly: "People did not believe that I was a fan, because I was a sertanejo, but people liked it. It was a way of expressing my affection".

Currently 

Lucas Lucco currently does about 25 shows a month and has been successful all over Brazil. Most of his shows happen in the states of Minas Gerais and Goiás.  He currently lives in Goiânia. The singer's participation in the media, including television and radio, are on the rise. He also participated in Domingão do Faustão in April 2014.

His first DVD, titled O Destino, was recorded on April 7th, 2014, in Patrocínio/MG, his hometown. It includes entries from Anitta, Fernando & Sorocaba, and Maluma. It was made available for pre-order on July 10th by iTunes and was released on DVD on July 22nd, 2014.

On November 27th, 2015, he released his fourth studio album entitled "Guess" with two previously released singles "Vai Vendo" and "Quando Deus Quer."

International career and acting career 

Lucas Lucco has built his career on international appeal. He has recorded songs in Spanish and English.

In 2015, he entered the soap opera Malhação, which debuted in August 2015. He played the role of Uódson. 

While he is proud of his work as a singer, Lucas Lucco has said he sees himself pursuing acting rather than singing in the future.

Discography

Studio albums

Live albums

Singles

Filmography

TV

Books

References

Living people
1991 births
People from Minas Gerais
21st-century Brazilian male singers
21st-century Brazilian singers
Brazilian songwriters
Brazilian actors
Brazilian film actors